Arthur Stringer (born January 30, 1954) is a former professional American football linebacker in the National Football League (NFL). He played five seasons for the Houston Oilers (1977–1981).

References

1954 births
Living people
People from Troy, Alabama
Players of American football from Alabama
American football linebackers
Ball State Cardinals football players
Houston Oilers players